Bachana Chahane Haru is a 1982 Nepali film directed by Pratap Subba. Shanti Thatal was the music director.

Film
The film was shot in various places of Darjeeling district, India. The lyrics were penned by Norden Rumba. The hero of the movie was Kiran Thakuri. Biswa Hingmang played the role of a police subinspector. The lead actress Punya Prabha Lohar was featured as a prostitute in the movie. The director, Pratap Subba, later married Punya Prabha.

Soundtrack

References

External links
 Ma Ta Mandina
 Naya Naya Gham ko Kiran

Nepalese drama films
Nepali-language films
1982 films
Nepalese black-and-white films